Theodore Havermeyer Northrup (1866–1919) composed one of the earliest rags, "Louisiana Rag", in 1897. The Thompson Music Company of Chicago in November, 1897 stated in a promo ad that it was "composed by Theo H. Northrup, the greatest living ragtime pianist. This piece has made an instantaneous hit and has become a great favorite everywhere." His other compositions in 1897 included "A Night on the Levee" and "Savannah Jubilee".

Compositions
Avon Waltzes (1887)
La Tosca Waltzes (1889)

1890
Just Ten

1891
All the Go
Two Happy Coons
The Moon's Pale Light is Beaming

1892
In the Ball Room: Schottische
The Possum Patrol
The Tennis Mazurka
Dancing Waves
Irene Slumbers, with W. Hill
Turn Texas Loose, with C. C. DeZouche

1893
The Angelus Bell
Dolores
In Lover's Lane, with E. Field
The Flower Gardener Waltzes
I'm A Sport

1894
Carrie and Her Wheel
A Kiss at Home
The Waif on the Street
Regret
The Golden Gate Brigade: March
The Loreley

1895
The Golden Treasury of Music from the World's Famous Composers, compilation and arrangement
Eaoline, with Louie Blosser
Papa, Be Good to Mama
Trilby 
Pat Wiley's Old Back Stoop, with William Lewis Elliot
One Night, with Lawrence Oxenford
Years Ago 
My Heart's Desire
The Sweetest Girl in Town

1896
My Eileen
The Anvil of Blacksmith John
It Is Better to Have Loved and Lost Than Ne'er to Have Loved at All, with Walter M. Auerbach
The Palms
Down in Maiden Lane, with Colin C. Hamand
I Love You So 
Over The Fence Sweet Polly

1897
Ben Harney's Ragtime Instructor, as arranger
Savannah Jubilee Schottische
A Night On The Levee
Louisiana Rag (Pas Ma La)
Only a Pair of Worn-Out Shoes, with William Fisher
One Sweetly Solemn Thought
Plantation Echoes
Susanna from Savannah, with George Evans

1898
Happy Hannah
On the Bayou

1899
I Cert'nly Was a Very Busy Man
My Dearest Girl
Virginia Capers
After What He Done To Me, with Nellie Smith Ravell
Where the Branches Kissed the River
Chester and Dorothy, with William S. Lord
The Lass and the Highland Plaid
Sue, Ma Sue, with Charles W. Doty
Over the Hills to Jersey

1900
Dost Thou Remember
Loquatias Moll
Suzanne from Gay Paree, with Harry Werner
I'm Glad to See You're Back, with Will D. Cobb
Pucker Up Your Lips Miss Lucy
A Good Run's Better Than a Bad Stand
The Conjure Man
When I'se By Her Side
She's Ma Little Sugar Plum
My Little Jungle Queen: A Congo Love
She's the Real Thing My Baby
Lou Lou: Sérénade

1901
United Confederate Veterans (U.C.V.) March
Gladys
Parthenia

1902
Polly Pry
Silas and the New York Girl
Lucy
The Broadway Brigade

1906
Uncle Sammy

1914
In the Forest

1915
Sometimes in Dreams

See also 
 List of ragtime composers

Sources 
 Blesh, Rudi, and Janis, Harriett. They All Played Ragtime (New York 1950). 
 Terry Waldo, This is Ragtime, 1991.

External links
http://ragpiano.com/comps/northrup.shtml

Ragtime composers
American male composers
American composers
1919 deaths
1866 births